One City Center may refer to:

One City Center (Portland), in Portland, Maine
One City Center (St. Louis), in St. Louis, Missouri